The 20th World Cup season began in August 1985 in Argentina (for men only), resumed in December 1985 in Italy, and concluded in March 1986 in Canada.  Because of the South America events (held during winter in the Southern Hemisphere), this was the first time that the World Cup season had started prior to December 1.  The overall champions were Marc Girardelli of Luxembourg, his second consecutive overall win, and Maria Walliser of Switzerland, her first.

This was the first season in which a separate discipline championship was awarded for Super G, which had been introduced as a part of giant slalom in the 1983 season.  The addition increased the number of discipline champions to five, which led to the elimination of the Combined discipline championship the next season.  Combined would not award another World Cup discipline championship until after the introduction of the "Super Combined" (downhill/slalom) or "Alpine combined" (Super G/slalom) races, but that championship would only last from the 2006/07 season until it was again eliminated after the 2011/12 season.

In addition, the number of men's races that counted for World Cup championship points reached 45, which remains the all-time high. There were also two individual parallel slaloms held for men (one in Vienna in January and one as the final event in Bromont) that only counted toward the Nations Cup team championship.

Calendar

Men

Ladies

Men

Overall 

see complete table

In Men's Overall World Cup 1985/86 the best five downhills, the best three Super Gs, best five giant slaloms, best five slaloms and best three combined count. The two parallel slaloms did not count for the Overall World Cup. 30 racers had a point deduction.

Downhill 

see complete table

Super G 

see complete table

In Men's Super G World Cup 1985/86 all 5 results count. This was the first ever Super G World Cup! It started late, when the first race was held at the beginning of February. Markus Wasmeier was able to finish every race on the podium and won the cup.

Giant Slalom 

see complete table

In Men's Giant Slalom World Cup 1985/86 the best 5 results count.

Slalom 

see complete table

Rok Petrovič won the cup with maximum points.

Combined 

see complete table

In Men's Combined World Cup 1985/86 the best 3 results count.

Ladies

Overall 

see complete table

In Women's Overall World Cup 1985/86 the best five downhills, the best three Super Gs, best five giant slaloms, best five slaloms and best three combined count. The parallel slalom only counts for the Nationscup (or was a show-event). 19 racers had a point deduction.

Downhill 

see complete table

In Women's Downhill World Cup 1985/86 the best 5 results count.

Super G 

see complete table

In Women's Super G World Cup 1985/86 all 5 results count. This was the first ever Super G World Cup!

Giant Slalom 

see complete table

In Women's Giant Slalom World Cup 1985/86 the best five results count.

Slalom 

see complete table

In Women's Slalom World Cup 1985/86 the best 5 results count. Roswitha Steiner won the Slalom World Cup discipline because she had more wins (4) than Erika Hess (2).

Combined 

see complete table

In Women's Combined World Cup 1985/86 the best 3 results count. Swiss athletes dominated and were able to win all five competitions.

Nations Cup

Overall

Men 

All points were shown including individual deduction. It is only shown the parallel slalom result from the race at Vienna, which is certain to count for the Nationscup. But without the parallel slalom race held at Bromont, because result ? (Also possible, that this parallel slalom was only a show-event.)

Ladies 

All points were shown including individual deduction. But without parallel slalom, because result ? (Also possible, that the parallel slalom was only a show-event.)

References

External links
FIS-ski.com - World Cup standings - 1986

FIS Alpine Ski World Cup
World Cup
World Cup